Plopu may refer to several places in Romania:

Plopu, a commune in Prahova County
Plopu, a village administered by Dărmănești town, Bacău County
Plopu, a village in Podu Turcului Commune, Bacău County
Plopu, a village administered by Ianca town, Brăila County
Plopu, a village in Armeniș Commune, Caraș-Severin County
Plopu, a village administered by Titu town, Dâmbovița County
Plopu, a village in Hurezani Commune, Gorj County
Plopu, a village in Gura Caliței Commune, Vrancea County
Plopu-Amărăşti, a village in Fărcaș Commune, Dolj County

See also 
 Plop (disambiguation)
 Plopi (disambiguation)
 Plopiș (disambiguation)